Kurt Lennart Ingemar Backman (born 7 February 1934) is a Swedish former footballer who played as a winger. He made more than 200 Allsvenskan appearances for IFK Norrköping and AIK between 1957 and 1968. A full international between 1958 and 1966, he won 31 caps and scored three goals for the Sweden national team.

Club career 
Born in Skellefteå, Backman started off his career with Skellefteå IF. In 1957, he signed for the Allsvenskan team IFK Norrköping where he played for two seasons. In 1959, he signed with AIK with which he spent ten seasons, appearing in a total of 194 league games. Nine of these seasons were spent in Allsvenskan, while he spent the 1962 season with AIK in Division 2 Svealand. In Division 2, Backman scored a total of 19 goals in 24 games, helping AIK win Division 2 Svealand and win promotion back to Allsvenskan by qualifying through the 1962 Allsvenskan promotion playoffs. He retired from professional football in 1968.

International career 

Backman made his full international debut for the Sweden national team on 7 May 1958 in a friendly game against Switzerland ahead of the 1958 FIFA World Cup. 65 minutes into his debut, Backman was replaced by Sylvie Bengtsson after picking up a knee injury. The injury ended up keeping Backman out of Sweden's 1958 World Cup squad and sidelined him from all football for the next couple of months.

Backman scored his first international goal for Sweden in a 6–0 friendly win against Denmark on 21 June 1959. He made his competitive debut for Sweden on 19 October 1960 in a 1962 FIFA World Cup qualifier against Belgium which Sweden won 2–0. He also represented Sweden in the UEFA Euro 1964 and 1966 FIFA World Cup qualifying campaigns, but never appeared in a major international tournament. He made his final international appearance on 4 June 1966 in a friendly against Finland.

In total, Backman won 31 caps for Sweden and scored three goals. He also appeared twice for the Sweden B team.

Bandy and ice hockey career 
A versatile athlete, Backman also represented AIK in bandy and ice hockey during his footballing career. He appeared a total of 16 times for the Sweden national bandy team, and helped his country finish second at the 1961 Bandy World Championship and third at the 1963 Bandy World Championship.

Career statistics

International 

 Scores and results list Sweden's goal tally first, score column indicates score after each Backman goal.

Honours 
AIK

 Division 2 Svealand: 1962
Individual
 Stor Grabb: 1960

References 

Living people
Swedish footballers
Allsvenskan players
Association football midfielders
Sweden international footballers
AIK Fotboll players
IFK Norrköping players
Swedish bandy players
AIK Bandy players
Katrineholms SK Bandy players
Sweden international bandy players
Swedish ice hockey players
AIK IF players
1934 births
People from Skellefteå Municipality
Sportspeople from Västerbotten County